Clay Aurand (born May 30, 1962) is a former Republican member of the Kansas House of Representatives, representing the 109th district from 1995 to 2013.

A farmer and stockman from Belleville, Kansas, Aurand has a BS in political science from Kansas State University.

Committee membership
Education (Chair)
Vision 2020
Veterans, Military and Homeland Security
Education Budget (Vice-Chair)

Elections

2012

After redistricting for the 2012 elections, Aurand ran  for House District 106.  He lost to incumbent Sharon Schwartz in the August 7 Republican primary,  by a margin of 2,456 to 2,368.

Major donors
The top 6 donors to Aurand's 2008 campaign:
1. Koch Industries $1,000 	
2. Kansans for Lifesaving Cures $750 	
3. Ruffin, Phil $500 	
4. Kansas Chamber of Commerce $500 	
5. Kansas Medical Society $500
6. Wal-Mart $500
His total receipts were $15,201.

References

External links
Kansas Legislature - Clay Aurand
Project Vote Smart profile
Kansas Votes profile
State Surge - Legislative and voting track record
Campaign contributions: 1996,1998,2000, 2002, 2004, 2006, 2008

Republican Party members of the Kansas House of Representatives
People from Belleville, Kansas
1962 births
Living people
21st-century American politicians
Kansas State University alumni
20th-century American politicians